Kevin Higgins may refer to:

 Kevin Higgins (American football) (born 1955), American football coach, currently an assistant coach at Wake Forest
 Kevin Higgins (Australian footballer) (born 1951), former Australian rules footballer
 Kevin Higgins (poet) (born 1967), Irish poet
 Kevin Higgins (baseball) (born 1967), Major League Baseball catcher